Kalthoon is a 1981 Indian Tamil-language drama film, directed by Major Sundarrajan. The film stars Sivaji Ganesan, K. R. Vijaya and Sundarrajan. It is based on the play of the same name. The film become a hit at the box-office, running for over 100 days in theaters.

Plot 

Parameshwaran Goundar, a farmer and a respectable honorable village chieftain, with much difficulty, sells his land to make Pazhanisamy, his youngest son, a doctor. He has two other sons, one adopted and one of his own. The younger son, however, turns out to be a womanizer though he tops in his college, much to the chagrin of father.

Parameshwaran's father too was a playboy and womanizer who murdered his own wife, Parameshwaran's mother, when she tries to stop him. Parameshwaran had murdered his own father not as vengeance but when his father's activities turn to ruin the village's reputation, his father being a chieftain. He serves his term and becomes the respectable chieftain for putting justice, respect and honour over family.

Seeing his third son follow suite of his father on account of his arrogance wrought by his education makes him hit him in front of the entire college. This turns the son against his entire family. The end is whether Parameshwaran Goundar delivers justice by killing his own son, as he did with his father, or the son relents and mends his ways.

Cast 
Sivaji Ganesan as Parameshwara Gounder
K. R. Vijaya
Major Sundarrajan
Nagesh
Thengai Srinivasan
V. S. Raghavan
V. K. Ramasamy
Thilak
 Jayamala

Production
Kalthoon was based on the stage play of the same name. Sundarrajan who acted in the play, directed the film adaptation.

Soundtrack 
The music was composed by M. S. Viswanathan, while the lyrics were penned by Kannadasan.

Reception 
Kutty Krishnan of Kalki criticised Sundarrajan's direction.

Legacy
After the film's success, Thilak adapted the film's title as a prefix.

References

External links 
 

1980s Tamil-language films
1981 drama films
1981 films
Films directed by Major Sundarrajan
Films scored by M. S. Viswanathan
Indian drama films
Indian films based on plays